Michigan's 13th Senate district is one of 38 districts in the Michigan Senate. It has been represented by Democrat Rosemary Bayer since 2023, following her victory over Republican Jason Rhines.

Geography
District 13 encompasses parts of Oakland and Wayne counties.

2011 Apportionment Plan
District 13, as dictated by the 2011 Apportionment Plan, covered eastern Oakland County in the northern suburbs of Detroit, including Troy, Rochester Hills, Royal Oak, Berkley, Clawson, Birmingham, Bloomfield Hills, and Rochester.

The district was split among Michigan's 8th, 9th, and 11th congressional districts, and overlapped with the 26th, 27th, 40th, 41st, and 45th districts of the Michigan House of Representatives.

Recent election results

2018

2014

Federal and statewide results in District 13

Historical district boundaries

References 

13
Oakland County, Michigan